Oriental Trading Company is a direct merchant of value-priced party supplies, arts and crafts, toys, novelties, and school supplies. It was founded in 1932 as one of the United States' first wholesaling companies. Oriental Trading has been recognized as one of the top 100 Internet retailers and one of the top 50 catalog companies. It is based in Omaha, Nebraska, and is owned by Berkshire Hathaway. Alternative known names for Oriental Trading Company include "Oriental Trading" & "OTC".

History
The company was founded as a gift shop in 1932 in Omaha, Nebraska by Harry Watanabe. The company expanded to 17 shops in the Midwest. During World War II, with restrictions against imports from Japan, the company shrank back to its Omaha base. Watanabe then bought a ceramic shop which made Kewpie dolls and other ceramic items.

In 1954 it resumed its imports from Japan and was a major carnival supplier and in 1956 it launched its first catalog.

In 1977 Watanabe's son Terrance Watanabe became president and its focus shifted from carnivals to supplying party goods for churches, schools, retailers, and individuals.

In 2000, Terrance sold his entire stake in the company to Los Angeles-based private equity firm Brentwood Associates, and resigned as CEO and President.  He became a philanthropist, but subsequently lost most of his fortune gambling in Las Vegas.

In 2006 The Carlyle Group bought 68 percent interest in the company with Brentwood owning a reported 25 percent.

On August 24, 2010, Oriental Trading Company via OTC Holdings Corp. declared Chapter 11 bankruptcy protection.

On November 2, 2012, Berkshire Hathaway announced they would acquire the company.

Oriental Trading acquired MindWare Holdings, Inc. in 2013 and SmileMakers in 2014. MindWare is a manufacturer, wholesaler, and direct retailer of "brainy toys for kids of all ages" (such as the game Qwirkle) that complements the Oriental Trading family of educational products. SmileMakers is the leading brand catering to the dental and healthcare markets.

The company's CEO Sam Taylor appeared in the March 10, 2012, episode of the TV show Undercover Boss. Taylor, who had been CEO since 2008, died after a year long illness in December 2017, and COO/CFO Steve Mendlik was named acting CEO in January 2018.

Notes

References

External links
 

2012 mergers and acquisitions
Retail companies established in 1932
Companies based in Omaha, Nebraska
Companies that filed for Chapter 11 bankruptcy in 2010
The Carlyle Group companies
Berkshire Hathaway
1932 establishments in Nebraska